Szyby  is a village in the administrative district of Gmina Bodzechów, within Ostrowiec County, Świętokrzyskie Voivodeship, in south-central Poland.

The village has a population of 380.

References

Szyby